Wheelchair fencing at the 1976 Summer Paralympics consisted of fourteen events, ten for men and four for women.

Medal summary

Men's events

Women's events

References 

 

1976 Summer Paralympics events
1976
Paralympics
International fencing competitions hosted by Canada